Murray Grapentine (born August 24, 1977 in Wetaskiwin, Alberta) is a volleyball player from Canada, who competes for the Men's National Team. Playing as a middle-blocker he was named Best Blocker at the 2003 and the 2007 NORCECA Championship. He played CIAU volleyball for the Alberta Golden Bears where he won a CIAU National Championship team in 1997 and was named the CIAU Men's Volleyball Player of the Year in 1999.

Individual awards
 2003 NORCECA Championship "Best Blocker"
 2006 Pan-American Cup "Best Blocker"
 2007 NORCECA Championship "Best Blocker"

References

External links
 FIVB profile
Canada Olympic Committee
Profile

1977 births
Living people
Alberta Golden Bears volleyball players
Canadian expatriate sportspeople in France
Canadian expatriate sportspeople in Italy
Canadian men's volleyball players
People from the County of Wetaskiwin No. 10
Sportspeople from Alberta
Volleyball players at the 1999 Pan American Games
Volleyball players at the 2007 Pan American Games
Pan American Games bronze medalists for Canada
Pan American Games medalists in volleyball
Medalists at the 1999 Pan American Games